Luis Fontés (26 December 1912 – 12 October 1940) was a British racing driver of Brazilian parentage who, along with John Stuart Hindmarsh, won the 1935 24 Hours of Le Mans for the Lagonda automobile company and won the inaugural Limerick Grand Prix in 1935 in an Alfa Romeo.  He also held a pilot's licence after learning to fly at Reading Aerodrome, Berkshire, UK, and entered his own Miles Hawk Speed Six racing aeroplane (registered G-ADGP) in the prestigious King's Cup Air Race in 1935.

On 6 October 1935, Fontés was taking part in an illegal road race on public roads while drunk, when he was involved in a head-on collision with a motorcyclist, Reg Mordike. Mordike died the next day and as a result Fontés was charged with manslaughter, and after being convicted, was sentenced to three years in prison. He was released from prison in February 1938 and soon resumed air racing, taking part in the 1938 King's Cup, finishing 13th, while also taking up powerboat racing. Fontés later briefly served as an Air Transport Auxiliary ferry pilot during World War II but was killed on 12 October 1940 while delivering a Vickers Wellington Mk1C bomber to an RAF Aircraft Storage Unit at RAF Llandow in South Wales. The Le Mans Lagonda M45R ('BPK 202') survives in the Dutch National Automobile Museum (Louwman Museum) at The Hague and the aeroplane was owned and raced for many years postwar by the late Ron Paine but is now owned by The Shuttleworth Collection, UK.

Racing record

Complete 24 Hours of Le Mans results

References

1912 births
1940 deaths
English racing drivers
24 Hours of Le Mans drivers
24 Hours of Le Mans winning drivers
Sportspeople convicted of crimes
Air Transport Auxiliary pilots
Aviators killed in aviation accidents or incidents in the United Kingdom
British civilians killed in World War II
Victims of aviation accidents or incidents in 1940